Pultenaea benthamii, commonly known as Bentham's bush-pea, is a species of flowering plant in the family Fabaceae and is endemic to south-eastern continental Australia. It is an erect shrub with sharply-pointed, narrow elliptic to linear leaves and yellow to orange and red flowers in clusters at the ends of branches.

Description

Taxonomy and naming
Pultenaea benthamii was first formally described in 1864 by Ferdinand von Mueller in Definitions of rare or hitherto undescribed Australian plants. The specific epithet (benthamii) honours George Bentham.

Distribution and habitat
This pultenaea grows in forest, woodland and heath with scattered populations in the Grampians National Park, in eastern Victoria and in the far south-east of New South Wales.

References

benthamii
Flora of Victoria (Australia)
Flora of New South Wales
Taxa named by Ferdinand von Mueller
Plants described in 1864